The Norrköping tramway network is a system of trams forming a principal part of the public transport services in Norrköping, Sweden. It has been in service since 1904, and is, along with the larger Gothenburg tram network, one of only two city-centre tramways in Sweden that survived the switch to right-hand traffic in 1967, which led to the replacement of most Swedish tramways with buses to reduce the cost of replacing their now-unusable fleets.

Routes

Since 1966, there are two routes in the system. Line 2 runs from Fridvalla in the north to Ringdansen in the south along Östra Promenaden in the city centre. Line 3 runs between Vidablick in the north and Klockaretorpet in the south-west via Drottninggatan in the city centre. Both lines stop at the Norrköping Central Station (Resecentrum) where they provide interchange with the national railway network. Interchange with intracity, intercity and suburban bus routes are provided at mainly Resecentrum and Söder tull.

Until 1958, a separate Line 1 trafficked the city centre as a loop, using the stretch of tracks in Kungsgatan (that was since removed in 1961). There is a modern heritage tram Line 1, trafficked with heritage trams from the tram museum in Norrköping, but it operates only seasonally (i.e. summers-only).

, Line 2 has been extended to Ringdansen. Until 2006, the Line ended in Klingsberg. The first part of the extension, to Ljura, opened in 2006 – this stage was only some 350 meters long. This section leaves the Klingsberg track at the Albrektsvägen stop, which means that Klingsberg lost its tram service. The third section, from Trumpetaregatan to Ringdansen, was inaugurated exactly one year later, October 21, 2011.

Operations

The Norrköping tramway is a standard-gauge electrically powered system, operated by Transdev on behalf of the regional transport authority, ÖstgötaTrafiken. The infrastructure and the tramcars are, however, property of Norrköping Municipality. It has track loops at the end of the lines and at various other points to allow turnbacks, as older trams were uni-directional. Today most trams are bi-directional but they are operated as uni-directional. The tram depot is located off Östra Promenaden, between the Djäkneparksskolan and Centralbadet stops.

Rolling stock
Norrköping’s fleet includes ten Duewag (designation M97) trams and 16 Bombardier Flexity Classic (designation M06).

Formerly in service were the single ex-Bremen and the three ex-Munich Type GT6N prototypes, which were withdrawn from service in 2015 after the catenary voltage was raised from 600 to 750 volts. The ex-Bremen tram (the world's first modern low floor tram) was returned to the north-german city for preservation.

As a stop gap measure six Tatra T6A2D were bought from Berlin's transit agency BVG until the arrival of the Flexity Classic on loan to Stockholm in January and February 2011. After arrival of the remaining M06 all Tatra trams were withdrawn from service also due to expiring certificates. There are plans to convert one T6A2D into a maintenance vehicle.

Network Map

See also

 List of town tramway systems in Europe
 List of town tramway systems in Sweden

Notes

References

External links

 Norrköping commune's official tramway web site 
 ÖstgötaTrafiken
 Tram Travels: Östgötatrafiken
 Track plan of the Norrköping tram system

Tramway
Rail transport in Östergötland County
Tram transport in Sweden
Norrköping
Train-related introductions in 1904
1904 establishments in Sweden